Glasgow Independent Schools is a public school district in Barren County, Kentucky, based in Glasgow.

Schools
The Glasgow Independent School District has two elementary schools, one middle school and one high school.

Elementary schools
South Green Elementary School
Highland Elementary School

Middle schools
Glasgow Middle School

High schools
Glasgow High School

References

External links
 Glasgow Independent Schools

School districts in Kentucky
Education in Barren County, Kentucky